Yekaterinburg–Passazhirsky is the central passenger railway station in Yekaterinburg, a major transportation hub, located on the Trans-Siberian main line and Sverdlovsk Railway. The station complex consisting of 4 buildings, provides 60 per diem departure passenger and commuter trains more than 180.

Routes 
Yekaterinburg station is a junction station on the Trans-Siberian main line. The current building was built in 1915. In the period from 1997 to 2001 the station was reconstructed and completely renewed.

Yekaterinburg station trains haul in seven directions, following in Abakan, Anapa, Adler, Almaty, Astana, Barnaul, Baku, Bishkek, Blagoveshchensk, Brest, Vladivostok, Volgograd, Izhevsk, Irkutsk, Kazan, Kemerovo, Kirov, Kislovodsk, Krasnoyarsk, Kurgan, Minsk, Moscow, Nizhnevartovsk, Nizhny Tagil, Novokuznetsk, Novosibirsk, Novorossiysk, Novy Urengoy, Orenburg, Beijing, Perm, Petropavlovsk, Samara, St. Petersburg, Severobaykalsk, Severouralsk, Solikamsk, Tashkent, Tyumen, Tomsk, Tynda, Ufa, Kharkiv, Vladivostok, Chita, Ulan Bator, Ulan-Ude, Mouth-Aha. Cars also ply direct messages to Berlin, Bijsk, Warsaw, Gomel, Grodno, Kyiv, Mogilev, Neryungri, Pavlodar, Pyongyang, Ruzaevka, Sovetskaya Gavan, Tommot, and Erdenet.

Trains and destinations

International

References 

Railway stations in Sverdlovsk Oblast
Buildings and structures in Yekaterinburg
Railway stations in the Russian Empire opened in 1915